Koekchuch is an extinct gender identity recorded among the Itelmens of Siberia. These were male assigned at birth individuals who behaved as women did, and were recorded in the late 18th century and early 19th century.

The Russian researcher of Siberia and Kamchatka, Stepan Krasheninnikov, in his “Description of the Land of Kamchatka” (Описании земли Камчатки) describes Koekchuch as “people of the transformed sex” - a special category of men who “go in women’s dresses, do all the women’s work and don't socialize with men”. According to Krasheninnikov’s description, the Koekchuch also served as concubines. Krasheninnikov notes similar phenomena not only among the Itelmens, but also among the Koryaks, however, the latter kept koekchuch, unlike Itelmens, “not in honor, but in contempt”.

References

LGBT in Russia
Gender in Asia
Gender systems
History of Siberia
18th century in LGBT history
19th century in LGBT history
Third gender
Transgender in Asia

Indigenous LGBT culture